Terrells Mountain or Terrell's Mountain is a hill in Chatham County, North Carolina, about 5–10 miles southwest of Chapel Hill.

The primary user of the antennas is WUNC and its sister stations which broadcast the public radio service operated by the nearby University of North Carolina.

External links
Facts about Terrells Mountain

Landforms of Chatham County, North Carolina
Mountains of North Carolina